Eric Gunnar Ericson (born 21 November 1974 in Sollentuna, Sweden) is a Swedish actor, educated at Gothenburg Theatre Academy 1995–98. He has been engaged at Helsingborg City Theatre 1997 & 1999, Folkteatern in Gothenburg 1999 and at Angereds Teater 2000–01.

Selected filmography
2010 – Fyra år till
2010 – Svaleskär (TV)
2009 – Göta kanal 3: Kanalkungens hemlighet
2007 – Gynekologen i Askim (TV)
2005 – Storm
2005 – Störst av allt
2005 – Som man bäddar
2004 – Hotet
2003 – De drabbade (TV)
2002 – Suxxess
2002 – Dieselråttor och sjömansmöss (TV)
2001 – Tsatsiki – vänner för alltid
2001 – Fru Marianne (TV)
1999 – Sjätte dagen (TV)
1996 – Vinterviken
1995 – Svarta skallar och vita nätter (TV)
1992 – Maskeraden (TV)
1990 – Storstad (TV series)

References

Swedish male actors
1974 births
Living people